Francis Wallace Meagher (1903 – 14 December 1966) was a rugby union player who represented Australia.

Meagher, a scrum-half, was born in Sydney and claimed a total of 8 international rugby caps for Australia. He was inducted into the Wallaby Hall of Fame in 2012.

References

Australian rugby union players
Australia international rugby union players
1903 births
1966 deaths
Rugby union players from Sydney
Rugby union scrum-halves